Mohamed Billal Rait (born 16 May 1986 in Boufarik, Algeria) is an Algerian professional footballer. He currently plays as a midfielder for the Algerian Ligue 1 club RC Arbaâ.

Statistics

References

External links

1986 births
Living people
Algerian footballers
Olympique de Médéa players
RC Arbaâ players
ES Sétif players
Algerian Ligue 2 players
Algerian Ligue Professionnelle 1 players
People from Boufarik
Association football midfielders
WA Boufarik players
21st-century Algerian people